John Adams (1735–1826), second president of the United States.

John Adams may also refer to:

Relatives of the United States president
 John Adams Sr. (1691–1761), father and grandfather, respectively, of two U.S. presidents
 John Quincy Adams (1767–1848), sixth president of the United States and son of President John Adams
 John Adams II (1803–1834), son of President John Quincy Adams and grandson of President John Adams
 John Quincy Adams II (1833–1894), American politician and grandson of President John Quincy Adams
 John Quincy Adams (1848–1919), land and townsite agent for Milwaukee Railroad

Politics

United States
 John Adams (Virginia politician) (1773–1825), mayor of Richmond, Virginia
 John Adams (New York politician) (1778–1854), congressman from New York
 John Q. Adams (Wisconsin politician) (1816–1895), Wisconsin state legislator
 John W. Adams (Wisconsin politician, born 1862) (1862–1939), Wisconsin state legislator
 John Adams (Wisconsin politician, born 1819) (1819–1908), Wisconsin state legislator
 John H. Addams (1822–1881), Illinois state senator and father of Jane Addams
 John J. Adams (1848–1919), congressman from New York
 John T. Adams (1862–1939), Republican National Committee chairman
 John Adams Sr. (Nebraska politician) (1876–1962), American minister, lawyer, and politician
 John Adams Jr. (Nebraska politician) (1906–1999), American lawyer and politician
 John Adams (Ohio politician) (born 1960), Ohio House of Representatives
 John Adams (journalist) (1819–?), American lawyer, politician and journalist in Maine

Elsewhere
 John Adams (Pembroke MP) (by 1511–1571/75), Welsh MP for Pembroke Boroughs
 John Adams (merchant) (1672/3–1745), American-born member of the Nova Scotia Council
 John Adams (Carmarthen MP) (c. 1746–1817), British politician
 John Adams, 1st Baron Adams (1890–1960), British politician and public servant
 Tom Adams (politician) or Jon Adams (1931–1985), prime minister of Barbados

Academics
 John Adams (Master of Sidney Sussex College, Cambridge) (died 1746), Master of Sidney Sussex 1730–1746
 John Adams (educational writer) (1750? – 1814), Scottish compiler of books for young readers 
 John Adams (educationist) (1857–1934), Scottish educator and Principal of the Institute of Education
 John Cranford Adams (1903–1986), American educator and president of Hofstra University 
 John Adams (geographer) (born 1938), English professor of geography and theorist on risk compensation

Arts and entertainment
 John Adams (poet) (1704–1740), only son of the Nova Scotian merchant John Adams
 John Turvill Adams (1805–1882), American novelist
 John "Grizzly" Adams (1812–1860), American mountain man and animal trainer
 John Clayton Adams (1840–1906), English landscape artist
 John Wolcott Adams (1874–1925), American illustrator
 John Quincy Adams (painter) (1874–1933), Austrian genre and portrait painter
 Jon Adams (musician) (born 1939), American folk musician
 John Adams (composer) (born 1947), American composer of classical music and opera
 John Clement Adams (born 1947), American composer and educator
 John Luther Adams (born 1953), American composer whose music is inspired by nature
 John Joseph Adams (born 1976), American science fiction and fantasy fiction editor

Works 
 John Adams (book), a 2001 biography by David McCullough
 John Adams (miniseries), a 2008 HBO television miniseries based on McCullough's book

Law
 John Hicks Adams (1820–1878), Deputy U.S. Marshal for the Arizona Territory 1878
 John Jay Adams (1860–1926), American lawyer and judge
 John R. Adams (born 1955), U.S. federal judge
 John Donley Adams (born 1973), American lawyer and candidate for Attorney General of Virginia
 J. Christian Adams (born 1968), American attorney and conservative activist

Military
 John Worthington Adams (1764–1837), British general in India
 John Giles Adams (1792–1832), U.S. commander at the Battle of Stillman's Run during the 1832 Black Hawk War
 John Adams (Confederate Army officer) (1825–1864), US Army officer
 John G. B. Adams (1841–1900), Civil War Medal of Honor recipient
 John Mapes Adams (1871–1921), Boxer Rebellion Medal of Honor recipient
 John Adams (Royal Navy officer) (1918–2008), British rear admiral
 John G. Adams (1932–2003), Army counsel in the Army-McCarthy hearings
 John Adams (Canadian general) (born 1942), Canadian military leader

Religion
 John Adams (Protestant martyr) (died 1546), burnt to death
 John Adams (Catholic martyr) (c. 1543–1586), English Catholic priest who was hanged, drawn, and quartered
 John Adams (Provost of King's College, Cambridge) (1662–1720), British Anglican priest
 John Adams (minister) (c. 1704–1757), Scottish minister and moderator of the General Assembly of the Church of Scotland
 John Adams (educator) (1772–1863), educator who organized several hundred Sunday schools
 John Greenleaf Adams (1810–1897), editor of religious texts
 John Adams (educational writer) (c. 1750–1814), Scottish minister and author of school texts

Science 
 John Adams (physicist) (1920–1984), British accelerator physicist
 John Couch Adams (1819–1892), British mathematician and astronomer
 John Franklin Adams (1843–1912), British amateur astronomer and author of stellar maps
 John Stacey Adams, behavioral psychologist known for equity theory

Sports

Football
 John C. Adams (1887–1969), American college football player
 John Adams (offensive lineman) (1921–1969), American football offensive lineman
 John Adams (running back) (1937–1995), American football player
 Johnny Adams (gridiron football) (born 1989), American football cornerback
 John Adams (center), college football player

Hockey
 John Adams (ice hockey, born 1920) (1920–1996), Canadian ice hockey winger in the NHL with the Montreal Canadiens
 John Adams (ice hockey, born 1946), Canadian ice hockey goaltender

Other sports
 Bert Adams (John Bertram Adams, 1891–1940), American baseball player
 John H. Adams (jockey) (1914–1995), American Hall of Fame jockey
 John Adams (basketball) (1917–1979), All-American basketball player from Arkansas
 John Adams (drummer) (1951–2023), perennial attendee of Cleveland Indians baseball home games
 John Adams (golfer) (born 1954), American professional golfer
 John Adams (judoka) (born 1960), Dominican Republic judoka

Other people
 John Adams (cartographer) (died 1738), produced a map of England and Wales
 John Adams (mutineer) (1767–1829), aboard HMS Bounty
 John Adams (glassmaker) (1823–1886), pioneer glass manufacturer
 John Bodkin Adams (1899–1983), British physician and suspected serial killer
 John Frank Adams (1930–1989), British mathematician
 John H. Adams (environmentalist) (born 1936), founding director and trustee of the Natural Resources Defense Council
 John Till Adams (1748–1786), English Quaker physician

Other uses
 Johnadams, a minor planet
 John Adams, California, the former name of Centerville, California, US
 USS John Adams, several US Navy ships
 John Quincy Adams (train), of the New York, New Haven & Hartford Railroad
 John Adams Institute for Accelerator Science, a UK physics research institute named for the physicist John Adams
 John Adams Institute (Netherlands) (Stichting John Adams Instituut), a 1987 American cultural promotion organization

See also
 Jonathan Adams (disambiguation)
 John Adam (disambiguation)
 Jack Adams (disambiguation)
 John Bertram Adams (disambiguation)